Webberville Community Schools was a public school district located in Webberville, Michigan. Schools that were included in this district were Webberville High School, Webberville Middle School, and Webberville Elementary School.

References
District website

Education in Ingham County, Michigan
School districts in Michigan